Perrigny is a commune in the Jura department in Bourgogne-Franche-Comté in eastern France. Perrigny is an eastern suburb of Lons-le-Saunier. The Vallière forms most of the commune's south-western border.

The parish church of Saint-Jean-Baptiste is on high ground on the eastern edge of the village, giving panoramic views over the commune.

Population

Notable people
 Jean Grivel (died 1624), lord of Perrigny
 Jean-François Stévenin, actor, lived in Perrigny in his youth.

See also
Communes of the Jura department

References

Communes of Jura (department)